Una Rebecca Ewert (born 11 January 1955) is a former New Zealand diver. She represented her country at two Commonwealth games and she was the first New Zealand diver to attend an Olympics.

Life
Ewert was born in Auckland. At the age of 15 she was selected to dive from three metres at the Commonwealth Games in Edinburgh in 1970. Four years later she was diving again from the one metre board at the next Commonwealth games in Chistchurch.

Ewert was New Zealand's first Olympic diver when she participated at the 1976 Summer Olympics representing New Zealand. She was again diving from three metres and she was placed 21st.

References

External links 
 Rebecca Ewert at the Olympic.org

1955 births
Living people
New Zealand female divers
Olympic divers of New Zealand
Divers at the 1976 Summer Olympics
Divers at the 1970 British Commonwealth Games
Divers at the 1974 British Commonwealth Games
Commonwealth Games competitors for New Zealand
20th-century New Zealand women
21st-century New Zealand women